The harp seal (Pagophilus groenlandicus), also known as Saddleback Seal or Greenland Seal, is a species of earless seal, or true seal, native to the northernmost Atlantic Ocean and Arctic Ocean. Originally in the genus Phoca with a number of other species, it was reclassified into the monotypic genus Pagophilus in 1844. In Greek, its scientific name translates to "ice-lover from Greenland," and its taxonomic synonym, Phoca groenlandica translates to "Greenlandic seal." This is the only species in the genus Pagophilus.

Description

The mature harp seal has pure black eyes. It has a silver-gray fur covering its body, with black harp or wishbone-shaped markings dorsally. The harp seal pup often has a yellow-white coat at birth due to staining from amniotic fluid, but after one to three days, the coat turns white and stays white for 2–3 weeks, until the first molt. Adolescent harp seals have a silver-gray coat spotted with black.

Physiology

Harp seals are considered sexually dimorphic, as the males are slightly larger, and more decorated. Males generally have a more defined dorsal harp marking and a darker head, while some females never develop the marking and remain spotted.

Diving
Compared to other phocid seals, the harp seal dives from shallow to moderately deep depths. Dive depth varies with season, time of day and location. In the Greenland Sea sub-population, the average dive rate is around 8.3 dives per hour and dives range from a depth of less than 20 to over 500 m. Dive duration ranges from less than two minutes to just over 20 minutes. During the spring and summer when seals forage along the pack ice in the Greenland Sea, most dives are less than 50 m. In the late fall and winter, dive depth has been found to increase, particularly in the Denmark Strait, where the mean dive depth was found to be 141 m.

Lactating female harp seals spend about 80% of the time in the water and 20% of the time on the fast ice weaning or near their pups. However, almost half of the time spent in the water is at the surface, well beyond what is expected to recover from dives. This behavior allows the mother harp seal to conserve energy and avoid the harsh conditions of the fast-ice while remaining near her pup. As with most phocids, she requires vast amounts of energy to ensure sufficient mass transfer to her growing, weaning pup.  Harp seals remain within their aerobic dive limit for 99% of dives.

Thermoregulation
Harp seal insulation changes over the course of a seal's lifetime. Young harp seals rely on a lanugo pelt from nursing all the way up to their weaning age. The insulating quality of this fur depends on its ability to keep a layer of air trapped inside or between the hairs. It takes a year for their blubber to develop and for their first-year pelage to grow. This transition from thick lanugo fur to blubber is important because lanugo fur does not insulate well in water. Adult harp seals primarily use blubber for insulation.

Harp seals combine anatomical and behavioral approaches to managing their body temperatures, instead of elevating their metabolic rate and energy requirements. Their lower critical temperature is believed to be under −10 degrees Celsius in air. Blubber insulates the harp seal's core but does not insulate the flippers to the same extent. Instead, the flippers have circulatory adaptations to help prevent heat loss. A thick coat of blubber insulates its body and provides energy when food is scarce or during fasting. Blubber also streamlines its body for more efficient swimming. Brown fat warms blood as it returns from the body surface as well as providing energy, most importantly for newly weaned pups.

Flippers act as heat exchangers, warming or cooling the seal as needed. On ice, the seal can press its fore flippers to its body and its hind flippers together to reduce heat loss. They can also redirect blood flow from the periphery to minimize heat loss.

Senses
The harp seal's eyes are large for its body size and contain a large spherical lens that improves focusing ability. Its mobile pupil helps it adapt to the intense glare of the Arctic ice. Its retina is rod-dominated and backed by a cat-like and reflective tapetum lucidum, enhancing its low light sensitivity. Its cones are most sensitive to blue-green spectra, while its rods help sense light intensity and may provide some color discrimination. Its cornea is lubricated by lacrimal glands, to protect the eye from sea water damage. The lack of tear ducts to drain secretions to the nasal passages contribute to the harp seals "eye rings" on land. This can be an indication of the hydration level of the seal.

On ice, the mother identifies her offspring by smell. This sense may also warn of an approaching predator. Underwater, the seal closes its nostrils, disabling its sense of smell.

Its whiskers, called vibrissae, lie in horizontal rows on either side of its snout. They provide a touch sense with labeled line coding, and underwater, also respond to low-frequency vibrations, such as movement.

Diet 
Like most pinnipeds, harp seals are carnivorous. They have a diverse diet including several dozen fish and invertebrate species. The White Sea population migrates northward in the summer to forage extensively in the Barents Sea.  Where common prey items include krill, capelin (Mallotus villosus), herring (Clupea harengus), flat fish and Gadiform fish. Harp seals prefer some prey, though their diet depends largely on prey abundance. Diet and abundance analysis of the Svalbard population found that this population predominantly eats krill, followed closely by polar cod (Arctogladus glacialis). Some individuals from the Greenland Sea sub-population have foraged in the Barents Sea alongside the White Sea sub-population during late summer and fall. Barents Sea harp seals eat mostly herring and polar cod but less krill or amphipods, likely because these seals usually dive deeper than such prey.   
Western North Atlantic harp seals forage both near and offshore of Newfoundland, most preferring such prey as Arctic cod (Boreogadus saida), capelin, Greenland halibut (Reinhardtius hippoglossoides) and American plaice (Hippoglossoides platessoides). As in other populations and foraging areas, diet varies with distance from shore, with arctic cod comprising more of it nearshore and capelin more of it offshore. However, capelin is the preferred prey in both locales.

Life history

Harp seals spend relatively little time on land compared with time at sea. They are social animals and can be quite vocal in groups. Within their large colonies, smaller groups with their own hierarchies form. Groups of several thousand form during pupping and mating season. Harp seals can live over 30 years in the wild.
On the ice, pups call their mothers by "yelling," and "mumble" while playing with others. Adults "growl" and "warble" to warn off conspecifics and predators. Underwater, adults have been recorded using more than 19 types of vocalization during courting and mating.

Reproduction and development
The harp seal is a fast ice breeder and is believed to have a promiscuous mating system. Breeding occurs between mid-February and April. Courtship peaks during mid-March and involves males performing underwater displays, using bubbles, vocalizations, and paw movements to court females. Females, who remain on the ice, will resist copulation unless underwater.

Females mature sexually between ages five to six. Annually thereafter, they may bear one pup, usually in late February. The gestation period lasts about 11.5 months, with a fetal development phase of 8 months. There have been reported cases of twin births, but singletons are vastly more common. The fertilized egg grows into an embryo which remains suspended in the womb for up to three months before implantation, to delay birth until sufficient pack ice is available.

Harp seal births are rapid, with recorded lengths as short as 15 seconds in duration. In order to cope with the shock of a rapid change in environmental temperature and undeveloped blubber layers, the pup relies on solar heating, and behavioral responses such as shivering or seeking warmth in the shade or even water.

After birth, the mother feeds only her own pup. Weaning is abrupt; the mother turns from nursing to promiscuous mating, leaving the pup behind on the ice. While courtship starts on the ice, mating usually takes place in the water.
After abandonment, in the post-weaning phase, the pup becomes sedentary to conserve body fat. Within a few days, it sheds its white coat, reaching the "beater" stage. This name comes from the sound a beater's tail makes as the seal learns to swim. Pups begin to feed at 4 weeks of age, but still draw on internal sources of energy, relying first on energy stored in the body core rather than blubber. During this time the ice begins to melt leaving them vulnerable to polar bears and other predators. This fast can reduce their weight up to 50%. As many as 30% of pups die during their first year, due in part to their early immobility on land.

Around 13–14 months old, the pups molt again, becoming "bedlamers". Juveniles molt several times, producing a "spotted harp", before the male adults' harp-marked pelt fully emerges after several years. In females, it does not emerge.

Seals congregate annually on the ice to molt, pup and breed before migrating to summer feeding grounds. Their lifespan can be over 30 years.

Distribution
Global harp seal population estimates total around 7.6 million individuals. The number of pups born in the traditional pupping area of the southern Gulf of St. Lawrence was greatly reduced, with an estimated pup production of only 18,300 (95% CI, 15,400-21,200 rounded to the nearest hundred). Another 13,600 (95% CI, 7,700-19,500) pups were born in the northern Gulf. An estimated 714,600 (95% CI, 538,800-890,400) pups were born off the northeastern coast of Newfoundland (Front); accounting for 96% of all pupping in 2017. Combining the estimates from all areas resulted in an estimated total pup production of 746,500 (95% CI, 570,300-922,700). Due to their dependence on pack ice for breeding, the harp seal range is restricted to areas where pack ice forms seasonally. The western North Atlantic stock, which is the largest, is located off eastern Canada. This population is further divided into two separate herds based on the breeding location. The Front herd breeds off the coast of Labrador and Newfoundland, and the Gulf herd breeds near the Magdalen Islands in the middle of the Gulf of St. Lawrence. A second stock breeds on the "West Ice" off eastern Greenland. A third stock breeds on the "East Ice" in the White Sea, which is off the north coast of Russia below the Barents ea. Breeding occurs between mid-February and April, and varies somewhat for each stock. The three stocks are allopatric and do not interbreed.

There are two recognised subspecies:

Migration and vagrancy
Their navigational accuracy is high, with good eyesight an important factor. They are occasionally found as vagrants, south of their normal range. In Great Britain, a total of 31 vagrants were recorded between 1800 and 1988.

More recently, they reached Lindisfarne in Northumberland in September 1995, and the Shetland Islands in 1987. The latter was linked to a mass movement of harp seals into Norwegian waters; by mid-February 1987, 24,000 were reported drowned in fishing nets and perhaps 30,000 (about 10% of the world population) had invaded fjords as far south as Oslo. The animals were emaciated, likely due to commercial fishing causing competition for the seals' prey.

Harp seals can strand on Atlantic coasts, often in warmer months, due to dehydration and parasite load. In March 2020, a harp seal was spotted near Salvo, North Carolina. Harp seals often consume snow to stay hydrated, but in mild winters may not have enough available. Several centers are active in seal rescue and rehabilitation, including IFAW, NOAA, and the New England Aquarium. Harp seals are protected by the Marine Mammal Protection Act in the United States.

Seal hunting

All three populations are hunted commercially, mainly by Canada, Norway, Russia and Greenland.

In Canada, commercial hunting season is from November 15 to May 15. Most sealing occurs in late March in the Gulf of St. Lawrence, and during the first or second week of April off Newfoundland, in an area known as "the Front". This peak spring period is generally what is referred to as the "Canadian seal hunt". Hunting Canadian whitecoats has been banned since 1987. Since 2000, harp seals that are targeted during the hunt are often found to be less than a year old, known as "beaters". In 2006, the St. Lawrence hunt officially started on March 25 due to thin ice caused by the year's milder temperatures. Inuit living in the region hunt mainly for food and, to a lesser extent, commerce.

In 2019, the Department of Fisheries and Oceans estimated sustainable harvest levels for the next five years. The identified annual Canadian Total Allowable Catch (TAC) levels were 425,000 assuming harvest age structures of 95% young of the year (YOY). In 2016, 66,800 harp seals and 1,612 grey seals were harvested in Atlantic Canada.

In 2005, the Independent Veterinarians' Working Group (IVWG) recommended a three-step process for hunters to kill the seals with little or no pain for the seals, as long as the process is completed in rapid succession. The process is as follows:

 Stun the seal on the head using tools, such as a rifle or a club, to immediately kill the animal or cause it to permanently lose consciousness.
 Ensure that step 1 was completed correctly, and the skull is irreversibly damaged.
 Cut the axillary arteries along both armpits and cut along the belly to prevent blood from reaching the brain, confirming its death.

In 2009, this process was included in both the 'Conditions of License' for the Canadian hunt as well as the Canadian Marine Mammal Regulations.

The Canadian seal hunt is monitored by the Canadian government. Although approximately 70% of the hunt occurs on "the Front", most private monitors focus on the St. Lawrence hunt, due to its more convenient location.

The annual quota off the coast of Greenland for 2017–2019 was set at 26,000 1+ animals, where two pups are equivalent to removing one 1+ animal. The total catches of harp seals were 2000 (including 1934 pups) in 2017, 2703 (including 1218 pups) in 2018, and 5813 (including 2168 pups) in 2019.

The 2004 West Ice total allowable catch (TAC) was 15,000, almost double the sustainable catch of 8,200. Actual catches were 9,895 in 2004 and 5,808 in 2005. The 2004 White Sea TAC was 45,000. The catch was 22,474.

Population dynamics 
Hunting has tremendously affected the population size of harp seals. Over the past 150 years, the harp seal population has fluctuated from over 9 million to as little as 1 million. As of 2019, the current population is estimated to be 7.6 million. The Northwest Atlantic populations was found to have decreased by at least 50 percent from 1952 to 1970  but nowadays, seal populations all are hunted under quotas and other restrictions.

See also
 
 
 Paro, a medical robot pet based on the harp seal

References

Further reading

The Northwest population:
 
 
 
 

The White Sea and West Ice populations:
 
 
 ICES 2001. Report of the Joint ICES/NAFO Working Group on Harp and Hooded Seals, ICES Headquarters, 2–6 October 2000. ICES CM, 2001, ACFM:8, 40 pp.

External links
 ICES/NAFO Working Group on Harp and Hooded Seals
 Smithsonian Institution – North American Mammals: Pagophilus groenlandicus 

Mammals described in 1777
Pinnipeds of the Arctic Ocean
Mammals of Europe
Mammals of Greenland
Phocins
Pinnipeds of North America
Pinnipeds of Europe
Taxa named by Johann Christian Polycarp Erxleben